D.U.C is the seventh studio album by French rapper Booba, it was released on 13 April 2015 by AZ and Tallac Records.

Track list
"D.U.C" 
"Tony Sosa" 	
"Belucci" (feat. Future)	
"Loin d'ici" 	
"Caracas"
"Mon Pays"
"All Set" (feat. Jeremih)	
"Les Meilleurs" (feat. 40000 Gang) 	
"Mové Lang" (feat. Bridjahting & Gato)		
"LVMH" 
"G-Love" (feat. Farruko) 	
"Billets Violets" 
"Ratpis" (feat. Mavado)	
"Jack Da"
"Mr. Kopp"
"Temps Mort 2.0" (feat. Lino)
"3G"
"La mort leur va si bien"
"OKLM"
"Loin d'ici" (Twinsmatic Mix)

Charts

Weekly charts

Year-end charts

Certifications

References

Booba albums
2015 albums
French-language albums